A Moment of Madness is the debut studio album by British singer-songwriter Izzy Bizu. The album was released on 2 September 2016.

Background
In June 2014, Bizu was selected by BBC Introducing to perform at Glastonbury Festival. In July 2014, she signed to Epic Records UK. A year later, she released the first singles from her debut album, "Adam & Eve" and "Diamond" which enjoyed support from BBC Radio 1, Radio 2 and 1Xtra. and performed at Glastonbury for the second time. In September 2015, following the release of her single "Give Me Love", she also made her TV debut on Later... with Jools Holland. Bizu supported both Rudimental and Foxes on their UK headline tours. In November 2015, Bizu was shortlisted for a Brit Critics' Choice award and won the BBC Music Introducing Award.

Track listing

Charts

References

2016 debut albums
Izzy Bizu albums
Epic Records albums